Joaquín Vázquez Fernández (26 August 1897 – 21 October 1965) was a Spanish footballer. He competed in the 1920 Summer Olympics. Fernández was born in Badajoz. He was a member of the Spanish team, which won the silver medal in the football tournament.

References

External links
 
 
 
 

1897 births
1965 deaths
Spanish footballers
Spain international footballers
Footballers at the 1920 Summer Olympics
Olympic footballers of Spain
Olympic silver medalists for Spain
Deportivo de La Coruña players
Olympic medalists in football
Medalists at the 1920 Summer Olympics
Association football forwards
Sportspeople from Badajoz
Sportspeople from Irun
Atlético Madrid footballers
La Liga players
Racing de Ferrol footballers
Real Unión footballers
Cultural Leonesa footballers
Footballers from Extremadura
Footballers from the Basque Country (autonomous community)